Helmut Grunsky (11 July 1904 – 5 June 1986) was a German mathematician who worked in complex analysis and geometric function theory. He introduced Grunsky's theorem and the Grunsky inequalities.

In 1936, he was appointed editor of Jahrbuch über die Fortschritte der Mathematik. In 1939 he was forced to leave this position after Ludwig Bieberbach accused him of employing Jewish referees in a notorious letter. He joined the Nazi Party on 1 April 1940, though he seems to have had little sympathy with its philosophy. He published in the journal Deutsche Mathematik. From 1949 he was Privatdozent at the University of Tübingen; later, he was professor at the University of Mainz and at the University of Würzburg.

Works

Sources

Notes

External links

20th-century German mathematicians
1904 births
1986 deaths
German cryptographers